SM UC-110 was a German Type UC III minelaying submarine or U-boat built for the German Imperial Navy during World War I.

Design
A German Type UC III submarine, UC-100 had a displacement of  when at the surface and  while submerged. The submarine was powered by two six-cylinder four-stroke diesel engines each producing  (a total of ), two electric motors producing , and two propeller shafts.

UC-100 was fitted with six  mine tubes, fourteen UC 200 mines, three  torpedo tubes (one on the stern and two on the bow), seven torpedoes, and one  SK L/45 or  Uk L/30 deck gun. Her complement was twenty-six crew members.

Construction and career
The U-boat was launched on 6 July 1918 and completed on 16 December 1918. Because UC-110 was finished after the end of fighting, she was never commissioned into the German Imperial Navy; had she been so commissioned, she would have been named SM UC-110. UC-110 was surrendered to the Allies at Harwich in 1919 in accordance with the requirements of the Armistice with Germany. She was retained by the UK for possible experimental work, but was in the event laid up at Portsmouth until scuttled in the English Channel on 1 July 1920.

References

Notes

Citations

Bibliography

 
 

Ships built in Hamburg
German Type UC III submarines
World War I minelayers of Germany
World War I submarines of Germany
1918 ships